Susannah King, (born July 12, 1987 in Ascot) is a professional squash player who represents Canada. She reached a career-high world ranking of World No. 64 in April 2007.

References

External links 

Canadian female squash players
Living people
1986 births